Rajesh Ranjan (born 24 December 1967), better known as Pappu Yadav, is an Indian politician. He won elections to the Lok Sabha (the lower house of the Parliament of India) in 1991, 1996, 1999, 2004 and 2014 from several constituencies in Bihar as an Independent / SP / Lok Janata Party / RJD candidate. Pappu Yadav became one of the 'best performing' MPs in 2015. Pappu Yadav is President of Jan Adhikar Party (Loktantrik).

Pappu Yadav defeated Sharad Yadav in the 2014 general elections. His wife Ranjeet Ranjan was MP from Supaul but lost to JD(U) in 2019 General Election, and is a Congress leader. His son Sarthak Ranjan is a cricketer and plays for the Delhi team. Pappu Yadav was given 'Y' category security by the Union Home Ministry. In the 2015 Bihar elections he formed his own Jan Adhikar Party (Loktantrik) and contested 40 seats. However, the party failed to make any impact and could barely capture 2 percent of the votes.

Life

Pappu Yadav was born on 24 December 1967 in a landowning family in Khurda Karveli village, Kumar Khand, Bihar. He studied in Anand Marg School, Anand Palli, Supoul. He completed graduation in Political Science from B N Mandal University, Madhepura and a diploma in Disaster Management and Human Rights from IGNOU. Rajesh Ranjan is his official name but nickname Pappu was given by his grandfather in childhood. He is married to Ranjeet Ranjan. He was a Member of Parliament from Madhepura. His son's name is Sarthak Ranjan who is a T-20 player.

He was elected to the Bihar Legislative Assembly from Singheshwar, Madhepura in 1990 as an independent candidate, and in 1991 he contested and won through to the 10th Lok Sabha from Purnia. He was at various times a member of RJD, the Samajwadi Party and the Lok Janshakti Party.

On 7 May 2015, the RJD expelled Rajesh Ranjan due to anti-RJD activities, after which he founded a new party Jan Adhikar Party.

On 9 May 2015, Pappu Yadav floated a new party Jan Adhikar Party before the elections. Pappu Yadav campaigned against Nitish-Lalu alliance. Jan Adhikar Party is fighting on 64 seats as part of Socialist Secular Morcha in 2015 Bihar Legislative Assembly election.

2009 Lok Sabha elections

On 2 April 2009, the Patna High Court rejected Yadav's plea to be allowed to contest the 2009 Indian parliamentary elections because he had been convicted of murder. On 11 April, RJD chief Lalu Prasad Yadav expelled Pappu Yadav from the party. His mother Shanti Priya, who was a candidate from Purnia, also lost to Uday Singh of Bharatiya Janata Party (BJP).

2010 Bihar elections 
During 2010 Bihar Vidhan Sabha elections Pappu Yadav along with Anil Yadav and Rampravesh Rai were expelled from the RJD for alleged anti-party activity. They were charged with working against the party's official nominee for Fatua assembly constituency, Ramanand Yadav.

2020 Bihar Legislative Assembly Election
In September 2020, prior to the Bihar Assembly Elections, Yadav floated a new alliance called People Democratic Alliance (PDA) which contained parties like Bahujan Mukti Party and SDPI (Social Democratic party of India), Indian Muslim league along with the party of Dalit activist and President of Bhim Army, Chandrashekhar Azad Ravan.

Controversies 
In 2008 Pappu Yadav was convicted by a special court in Ajit Sarkar murder case of 1998. He was involved in various controversies while in imprisonment, like holding audiences and having unrestricted access to cellphones. He was acquitted in 2013 from Patna high court.

In his autobiography Drohkaal ka Pathik, released in November 2013, Pappu Yadav has alleged that three MPs of his Indian Federal Democratic Party got money from the then finance minister Yashwant Sinha, to join the NDA in 2001. He has also claimed that during the July 2008 trust vote, both the Congress and BJP had offered "Rs 400 million each" to MPs for their support.

In 2015 he was once again in controversy after being reported to have allegedly threatened to hit an airhostess with slippers.

In May 2021, Pappu Yadav was arrested in a 32 year old kidnapping case and for flouting COVID-19 norms. Pappu Yadav has alleged political vendetta as he was raising questions against government expenditures in ambulance management during Covid.

References

External links
 Official Website of Rajesh Ranjan (Pappu Yadav)
 Official Website of Jan Adhikar Party (Loktantrik)

Rashtriya Janata Dal politicians
Living people
1967 births
India MPs 2014–2019
Lok Sabha members from Bihar
People from Madhepura district
Independent politicians in India
Samajwadi Party politicians
Lok Janshakti Party politicians
India MPs 1991–1996
People from Purnia district
India MPs 1996–1997
India MPs 1999–2004
India MPs 2004–2009
Members of the Bihar Legislative Assembly